The 2009 season of competitive football in Thailand.

The season began on 7 March 2009 for the Thai Premier League and 21 March 2009 for the Division 1 League. The Division 1 season ended on October 17, 2009, and the Thai Premier League season ended on October 18, 2009.

Promotion and relegation (pre-season)
Teams promoted to Thai Premier League 2009
 Muangthong United
 Sriracha
 Rajnavy Rayong

Teams relegated from Thailand Premier League 2008
 Customs Department Phetchaburi
 Royal Thai Army
 Bangkok Bank (withdraw)

Teams promoted to Thai Division 1 League 2009
 Prachinburi
 Songkhla
 Sisaket

Teams relegated from Thailand Division 1 League 2008
 Phitsanulok
 Raj-Vithi

Managerial changes

Diary of the season
 1 March 2009: Chonburi won the Kor Royal Cup beating PEA 1-0 at Suphachalasai Stadium.
 7 March 2009: The first Thai Premier League matches of the season are played.
 18 November 2009: Thailand lost to Singapore at home stadium for first time in 34 years, after they lost 0-1 in 2011 AFC Asian Cup qualification.
 23 October 2009: The Thai FA Cup is won by Thai Port on penalties against BEC Tero Sasana after a 1-1 draw at Suphachalasai Stadium.

Retirements

 18 October 2009: Tawan Sripan, 37-year-old BEC Tero Sasana midfielder.

National team

Friendly matches

King's Cup

Asian Cup qualifiers
Thailand is currently in Group E of the 2011 AFC Asian Cup qualification process.

Honours

 
Seasons in Thai football